Real tennis – one of several games sometimes called "the sport of kings" – is the original racquet sport from which the modern game of tennis (also called "lawn tennis") is derived. It is also known as court tennis in the United States, formerly royal tennis in England and Australia, and courte-paume in France (to distinguish it from longue-paume, and in reference to the older, racquetless game of jeu de paume, the ancestor of modern handball and racquet games). Many French real tennis courts are at jeu de paume clubs.

The term real was first used by journalists in the early 20th century as a retronym to distinguish the ancient game from modern lawn tennis (even though, at present, the latter sport is seldom contested on lawns outside the few social-club-managed estates such as Wimbledon).

There are more than 50 active real tennis courts in the world, located in the United Kingdom, Australia, the United States and France. Other countries have currently disused courts, such as the two in the Republic of Ireland. The sport is supported and governed by various organizations around the world.

Equipment

Balls
Unlike latex-based technology underlying the modern lawn tennis ball, the game uses a cork-cored ball which is very close in design to the original balls used in the game. The  diameter balls are handmade and consist of a core made of cork with fabric tape tightly wound around it, compacted by outer windings of string, and covered with a hand-sewn layer of heavy, woven, woollen cloth, traditionally Melton cloth (not felt, which is unwoven and not strong enough to last as a ball covering). The balls were traditionally white, but around the end of the 20th century "optic yellow" was introduced for improved visibility, as had been done years earlier in lawn tennis.

Despite trials by Dunlop to introduce machine-made balls in the 1970's, almost all balls are entirely hand made by club professionals. The inner core of a ball can last several years, but the cover needs to be replaced every two to three weeks, depending on usage. Balls are produced in sets of around 60 balls and kept and maintained by clubs. They are not available for purchase by the general public. Balls are stored in a wicker or plastic basket placed in a hole in the floor underneath the net. A trough under the net allows balls hit into the net to roll into the basket. The entire basket of balls is tipped into a tray in the dedans prior to play to reduce time spent fetching balls. As such, ball kids are not required in real tennis.

Rackets

The  short, asymmetrical racquets are made of wood and use very tight nylon strings to cope with the heavy balls. The racquet oval is shaped to make it easier to strike balls close to the floor or in corners, and to facilitate a fast shot with a low trajectory that is difficult for an opponent to return. However, the rackets have a small sweet spot, which discourages a large swing in a shot and emphasises accuracy. Rackets are made of a combination of ash, hickory, vulcanized fibre and willow. Gut strings have now entirely been replaced by nylon, allowing strings to be tighter. Rackets are laminated, with improvements in epoxy resulting in stronger, sturdier rackets which last longer and have changed the game to be faster and more hard hitting.

Most of the rackets in the world are produced by Grays of Cambridge, based in Cambridge in the United Kingdom. Companies that have previously produced real tennis rackets include Dunlop, Slazenger and Gold Leaf Athletics. The introduction of graphite rackets in lawn tennis has reduced the demand for wooden rackets of any sport, resulting in the larger companies leaving the industry.
More recently, Harrow Sports has introduced graphite rackets which are not currently permitted by the rules of the game, but are being trialled at the club level.

Due to the small nature of the game, rackets are almost exclusively sold by club professionals who also provide restringing services to club members. Even at the elite level, professionals string their own rackets.

Courts

There are two basic designs in existence today: jeu quarré, which is an older design, and jeu à dedans. Both are doubly asymmetric: each end of the court differs in shape from the other, and the left and right sides of the court are also different. All existing tennis courts in the modern day are of the jeu à dedans variety, except the court at Falkland Palace in Scotland. The jeu à dedans court is a rectangular indoor court with high walls on all four sides and a high ceiling. The surrounding walls are usually constructed of brick or cinder block and are plastered smooth. Some courts, notably Prested and Washington feature glass walls down to floor level, though many more have recently installed glass walls higher up to increase viewing capacity without impacting play. 

The wall without a penthouse is called the main wall.

Counting clockwise from the main wall, the penthouse are called the dedans penthouse, the service penthouse and the grille penthouse. The side featuring the dedans penthouse is also known as the service end, and the side featuring the grille penthouse is also known as the hazard end. Beneath the penthouses are various openings in the wall, which have various mechanics in the gameplay and allow spectators to view the game. A net across the opening allows spectators to view the game without fear of injury. The grille is generally blocked by a solid wood cover and features a picture or club logo, though American courts generally have netting instead. Beneath the service penthouse is a long opening, divided up into smaller openings by wooden or metal posts. The central such opening, known as the line, extends to the floor and allows players to enter the court and change ends. Counted from the centre of the court, the openings are known symmetrically as first gallery, the door, second gallery and last gallery, though at the end of the court closet to the grille penthouse the final opening is instead called the winning gallery and contains a bell which rings when a ball enters the opening.

Strung across the centre of the court is a net, which sags in the middle. Most courts feature a trough and a sunken basket at the base of the net for collecting balls at the change of ends. 

Often, the service court is painted a different colour to the rest of the floor. A series of lines called chase lines measuring distance from the back of the court on the service side and the service line on the hazard side towards the net. Courts in the United Kingdom, United States and Australia mark the distance in intervals yards from the back wall. The lines are numbered on the side walls up to 6 on the service side and 2 on the hazard side, with the seventh line corresponding to the last gallery and second gallery respectively. Subsequent lines correspond to the gallery openings up to first gallery. Often, the last gallery and second gallery lines on the service end are a different colour to the remainder of the lines to make them easier to identify. At Prested in Essex, the floor is painted in alternating green and blue colours in lieu of chase lines. In France, the lines are measured in pied du roi, numbering up to 14 on the service side and 4 on the hazard side. 

As many courts were built before the introduction of electric lighting, most courts feature clerestory windows above the main and service walls. Typically, these areas are considered out of court, and are demarcated with an out of court line that extends around the top of the playing area. Often, the out of court area is not plastered like the playing area. Notable exceptions include Hobart, where the wall between the windows is considered in play, and Hyde Bridport, where the two windows at the ends of the court are still in play. Alternatively, some courts feature skylights in the roof of the building. All courts now feature artificial lighting, allowing play at all times of day. Some modern courts, such as Radley and Oratory do not feature windows at all, and are lit entirely artificially. Most courts have gabled roofs, with the ridge line along the length of the court. As such, each court has local rules as to whether balls hit over the beams are in or out of play.

The court at Falkland Palace is the last remaining jeu quarré design which unlike jeu à dedans court lacks a tambour, a dedans and a dedans penthouse. Instead, it features an ais, a piece of wood on what would be the dedans wall adjacent to the service penthouse, and four lunes, openings in the walls high above what would be the dedans. The court is the only existing, playable court in the world to not have a roof.

Manner of play

Service
To begin play, the players spin a racket or toss coin to decide who serves first. Serves are always made from the service end of the court, that is, the side of the court with the dedans. Unlike lawn tennis, at least one foot must be grounded during the service, but the player may serve from anywhere in the court between the dedans wall and the second gallery line. The serve is played onto the service penthouse, and must touch the service penthouse at least once on the receiver's (hazard) side of the court. It may also touch the service wall above the penthouse or the service penthouse on the server's side. From there, it may touch any other surface including the back wall, back penthouse or battery wall. Serves may be volleyed by the receiver, or be played off a single bounce on the floor. To be a valid serve, the ball must land in the rectangle marked by the service line and the fault line. Serves which land between the fault line and the main wall, beyond the service line, or fail to touch the service penthouse are called fault. Players are permitted a second serve, but if it is also a fault, then the server double faults and the receiver wins the point. Under French rules, balls which land between the fault line and the main wall are not considered a fault, and are instead called a pass, with the serve replayed.

In doubles play, the two players in the pair alternate serving or receiving at the end of each game. The first player will serve or receive the entirety of the first game, with the second player serving or receiving the entirety of the second game and so on. This means that a player from one team will only serve or receive from one player from the other team for the entire set. The exception is if a serve lands between the center line and the fault line, in which case either receiving player may elect to play the ball. At the start of each new set, the players may switch who is serving first and second. The pair at the service end must nominate the first server before the pair at the hazard end nominates the first receiver, so players will occasionally play tactically to ensure that they are at the hazard end at the end of each set to ensure they can chose the match-ups for the new set.

Because there are numerous surfaces for the ball to touch during a serve, there are many different styles of serves which are chosen to achieve different tactical advantages. Since the court is asymmetric, different techniques are required for right and left-handed players. Some of the most common serves include:
 Railroad
 Served from the back of the court close to the service wall, the railroad is played overhead with a fast right-to-left action. For right handed players, the stance is usually front-on with the service motion lead by the elbow to impart side-spin on the ball, whereas for left handed players, the service is similar to a slice serve in lawn tennis. An ideal railroad will bounce no more than a few inches from the bottom of the penthouse, then kick off the floor back towards the galleries, forcing the receiver to play the wall close to the side penthouse and out of position up the court.
 Bobble
 Served from the center of the court, often around last gallery, the bobble is played with no spin and hit softly at around hip height. It should bounce or roll several times on the service penthouse but not the service wall, forming an arc and falling close to the grille wall with as little forward momentum as possible. Often served as a second serve, it is often the first serve learnt by beginners.
 Demi-piqué
 Served from the centre of the court, near last gallery, the demi-piqué is played with left-to-right spin - for right handers it is played at head height while for left handers it is played below the waist. A demi-piqué strikes the service penthouse once near hazard first gallery, then the side wall, then may or may not hit the service penthouse a second time on the way down. The uncertainty of the trajectory on the way down makes it difficult to volley.
 Underarm twist
 Served mostly by right handers from the back of the court near the service wall, the underarm twist is played with right-to-left spin and played around knee height. For variation, it may or may not hit the service wall. It is typically much slower in pace than a railroad, despite having similar spin that kicks back towards the galleries. Left handers achieve a similar effect with a railroad, which is typically easier to learn than for right handers.
 Side wall
 Served from the back of the court near the side penthouse, the side wall serve is played with a left-to-right spin at around head height. It is hit directly onto the side wall above the net, then hitting the service penthouse on the way down. If allowed to hit the back wall, the serve will spin towards the grille, making it more difficult to hit to the right hander's forehand corner.
 High serve/Chandelle
 Served from the main wall at around last gallery, the high serve, also known as a chandelle, is hit as close to the roof as possible, falling once on the service penthouse and then close to the back wall. The serve can be played with either side spin or under spin, resulting in different variations when bouncing off the service penthouse.
 High side wall
 Similar to the high serve, the high side wall will hit the service wall before the service penthouse, resulting in the ball running along the grille wall. Difficult to return when served well, if served too long results in a fault (or pass in France), while if served too short is generally easy for the receiver.
 Giraffe
 Also similar to the high serve, except served from close to the service penthouse at about second gallery. 
 Drag
 Served from very close to the service wall, the drag is played with heavy backspin. For right handers, this is typically achieved by serving as a backhand, while for left handers it can be served forehand. When served short, the backspin causes the ball to loose forward momentum, while when served long will spin off the back wall towards the tambour
 Boomerang
 Served from the center of the court, the boomerang is played deep onto the service penthouse, before bouncing up to the grille penthouse, then the back wall, returning to the service penthouse and falling flush with the grille wall. When served well, it is impossible to return, so there is a gentlemen's agreement that the serve is not used in high level play.
 Piqué
 Served from near the main around the second gallery line, the piqué is played with an overhead action, hit hard directly at the service penthouse. The ball then flies high in the air and lands near the grille wall close to the fault line. It is often used to target a weaker receiver in doubles play.
 Caterpillar
 Served from near the second gallery line in the centre of the court, the serve is played with a side wall action for right-handers or a railroad action for left-handers. The ball is played deep into the service penthouse, then striking the service wall, the grille penthouse, the back wall before finally falling flush with the grille wall close to the fault line. Rarely seen in singles play, it is often used to target a weaker receiver in doubles play.
 African hunting dog
 Served from the back of the court near the service wall, the African hunting dog is played overhead with a left-to-right spin, similar to a slice serve in lawn tennis. It typically bounces several times on the service penthouse before spinning off the back wall towards the center of the court. As it does not keep the ball close to any walls, it is generally easy for the receiver, and is often only seen by players with prior experience in lawn tennis, and not at all in high level play.

Chases

Because of the asymmetry of the court, play generally favours the player at the service end of the court. The presence of the tambour at the hazard end introduces uncertainty for the receiving player. Unlike lawn tennis, where players alternately serve and receive entire games, in real tennis players must win the right to serve. To do so, the receiver must lay a chase, though a server can also lose the right to server by laying a hazard chase. There are four ways to lay a chase:
 The receiver hits a 'winner', that is, a shot which is not reached by the server. The chase is marked at the point the ball becomes dead, i.e., the second bounce on the floor, as measured from the back wall using the chase lines.
 The receiver hits the ball into the galleries on the service side of the net (last gallery, second gallery, the door, or the line). The chase is marked by the line corresponding to the gallery the ball entered. Hitting a gallery post corresponds to entering the gallery closer to the net.
 The server hits the ball into any of the galleries on the hazard side of the net except the winning gallery (which would win the point). The server loses the right to serve and has laid a hazard chase, which is marked by the line corresponding to the gallery the ball entered.
 The server hits a ball not retrieved by the receiver but becomes dead between the net and the service line. The server loses the right to serve and has laid a hazard chase, which is marked by the point the ball becomes dead as measured from the service line.

Laying a chase or hazard chase does not immediately score points nor trigger a change of ends. Instead, the length of the chase is recorded and play continues until either:
 The score reaches game point, or
 Two chases (including hazard chases) have been laid.

When the condition is met, the players change ends and resolve the chases in the order in which they were laid. To resolve a chase, the point is played with the additional condition that shots hit by the receiver must not become dead (i.e. second bounce or entering a gallery) further from the back wall than the point at which the chase had been set, in which case the receiver would lose the chase (and also the point). In the case of a hazard chase, any winner hit by the receiver wins the point, but any ball that becomes dead between the point where the chase was marked and the grille wall loses the point. Any shot which is equal to the length of the chase being played is called chase off - no change is made to the score but the chase is not replayed. The presence of chases encourages players to play the ball as deep into the court as possible, as short chases close to the back wall are heavily weighted towards the server, and discourages shots such as a smash or a drop shot.

Openings

There are three so-called winning openings that win the point automatically for the player on the opposite side of the net. These are:
 Dedans
 The largest of the three openings, and the only one at the service end. Players aiming for the dedans typically hit the ball hard and flat with slight top-spin, a shot known as a force. Forces may be hit either directly down the court or off the main wall, the latter being a boasted force. Such shots typically result in the serving player deploying a defensive volley from the back of the court. At lower standards of play, players may also attempt to hit the dedans using a lob shot, either directly into the dedans or after bouncing once on the floor. Shots hit too high go onto the dedans penthouse, and are usually an easy ball for the server to play.
 Grille
 The smallest of the three openings, positioned next to the tambour. Because balls struck towards the grille threaten to hit either the tambour or the grille, the receiving player must use their judgement as to which shot to defend. In doubles play, each player covers one of the two features.
 Wining gallery
 Positioned mirroring the last gallery but on the hazard side, the winning gallery can be identified by the presence of a bell in the netting of the gallery that rings when the gallery is struck. The gallery is rarely defended, but difficult to hit, as inaccurate shots could go into hazard second gallery, conceding a hazard chase and losing the right to serve.

Play

The heavy, solid balls take a great deal of spin, which often causes them to rebound from the walls at unexpected angles. For the sake of a good chase (close to the back wall), it is desirable to use a cutting stroke, which imparts backspin to the ball, causing it to come sharply down after hitting the back wall. Players at the hazard end will generally try to hit the ball as deep into the court as possible to lay difficult chases and recover the serve. Players at the service end will use the uncertainty caused by the tambour to deceive their opponents. Different serves and strategies are deployed to prevent players hitting chases, galleries or openings, particularly when playing off chases. Moreover, because of the weight of the balls, the small racquets, and the need to defend the rear of the court, many lawn tennis strategies, such as playing with topspin, and serve-and-volley tactics, are ineffective, except in doubles play.

Play must be continuous, so at the conclusion of one point, the server immediately collects a new ball and moves into position to serve the next point. Time wasting is generally not observed. Players may generally take a short break at the change of ends for refreshments, but may not leave the court except with the permission of the marker (and usually at the end of the set). The general etiquette is that the player changing from the service end to the hazard end will wait for the other player to come around the net, and place a ball on their racket for them to serve.

Marker

The score of the match is kept by a marker. The role of the marker is to mark the position of chases, call service faults, record the score and manage the conduct of the players. Traditionally, the marker stands at the net opening to get a view of the whole court. However, from this position the marker cannot see the service penthouse, so must rely on the sound of the ball or an assistant marker to call service faults. For safety reasons, most clubs and tournaments have moved the marker to a seat in the dedans. In this case, the players call the length of any hazard chases, unless an assistant marker is employed in the grille. As the game is small, most professionals are also trained markers, hence it is not uncommon to see players in a tournament marking other matches in the same draw, even at the elite level.

Scoring

Game
The scoring system of real tennis mirrors that of lawn tennis, the latter having inherited the system from the former. A game is won by the first player to have won a total of four points, and to be at least two points more than their opponent. The points are called "love", "15", "30" and "40" repectively. If both players have reached 40 in the game, the score is called as deuce. After a game has reached deuce, the player with one more point than their opponent has advantage. The score is typically called as "advantage server" or "advantage receiver"" as appropriate. Unlike lawn tennis, where the first score called corresponds to the server, in real tennis the first score called corresponds to the player who has won the most recent point. As chases are resolved at or before game point, no chases carry through to subsequent games. 

In handicap matches, players may require different numbers of points to win a game. A player with receiving odds starts a game requiring less than four points to win the game, while a player with owing odds requires more than four points to win the game. Such odds are counted backwards, so a player requiring five points starts at "owe 15", while a player requiring six points starts at "owe 30". A player with half-odds starts each second game with the nominated score, that is, a player playing "owe half 15" starts the first game at love, and the second game at owe 15. In handicap matches, deuces are never played - a score of 40-all is winner-takes-all.

Set
A set is a series of games counted up to a predetermined number, usually 6. The sets are counted in the ordinary manner (ie. 1, 2, 3 etc). There are no tiebreakers or advantage sets played, so at a score of 5-all, the player who wins the next game wins the set. Because the service is decided by the chase rule, rather than alternating between the players, there is little residual advantage from serving first by the time the set is nearly over. 

Depending on the tournament, the number of games required to win a set can be varied by the tournament organisers. 8 is a popular choice, also known as a pro set, though variations include sets to any number between 5 and 10. Some tournaments permit an unlimited number of games in the set, with the match only concluding if a timer has expired. If the match is to be played across more than one set, the set is only ever to 6 games.

Match

A match is a sequence of sets. A match is determined through a best of n sets system. In tournaments with a round robin stage (often as the qualification to a knock-out stage) matches are usually played to one set. Minor tournaments, Ladies Open tournaments and Ladies World Championships are played as best of three sets. Major tournaments, leading amateur tournaments, Open tournaments and matches up to the semi-finals of the Doubles World Championships are played as best of five sets. Matches in the first round of the Singles World Championships are played as best of nine sets, played across two days with four or five sets on the first day, and from zero to four sets on the second day. The Singles World Championships Final Eliminator and Final Challenge are played as best of thirteen sets, played across three days, with rest days inbetween.

History

The term "tennis" is thought to derive from the French word tenez, which means "take heed" – a warning from the server to the receiver. Real tennis evolved, over three centuries, from an earlier ball game played around the 12th century in France. This had some similarities to palla, fives, Spanish pelota or handball, in that it involved hitting a ball with a bare hand and later with a glove. This game may have been played by monks in monastery cloisters, but the construction and appearance of courts more resemble medieval courtyards and streets than religious buildings. By the 16th century, the glove had become a racquet, the game had moved to an enclosed playing area, and the rules had stabilized. Real tennis spread across Europe, with the Papal Legate reporting in 1596 that there were 250 courts in Paris alone, near the peak of its popularity in France.

Royal interest in England began with Henry V (reigned 1413–22) but it was Henry VIII (reigned 1509–47) who made the biggest impact as a young monarch, playing the game with gusto at Hampton Court on a court he had built in 1530 and on several other courts in his palaces. His second wife Anne Boleyn was watching a game of real tennis when she was arrested and it is believed that Henry was playing tennis when news was brought to him of her execution. Queen Elizabeth I was a keen spectator of the game. During the reign of James I (1603–25), there were 14 courts in London.

In France, François I (1515–47) was an enthusiastic player and promoter of real tennis, building courts and encouraging play among both courtiers and commoners. His successor, Henry II (1547–59), was also an excellent player and continued the royal French tradition. The first known book about tennis, Trattato del Giuoco della Palla was written during his reign, in 1555, by an Italian priest, Antonio Scaino da Salo. Two French kings died from tennis-related episodes – Louis X of a severe chill after playing and Charles VIII after striking his head on the lintel of a door leading to the court in the royal Château at Amboise. King Charles IX granted a constitution to the Corporation of Tennis Professionals in 1571, creating a career for the 'maître paumiers' and, establishing three levels of professionals – apprentice, associate, and master. The first codification of the rules of real tennis was written by a professional named Forbet and published in 1599.

The game thrived among the 17th-century nobility in France, Spain, Italy, the Netherlands, and the Habsburg Empire, but suffered under English Puritanism, as it was heavily associated with gambling. By the Age of Napoleon, the royal families of Europe were besieged and real tennis, a court game, was largely abandoned. Real tennis played a role in the history of the French Revolution, through the Tennis Court Oath, a pledge signed by French deputies in a real tennis court, which formed a decisive early step in starting the revolution.

An epitaph in St Michael's Church, Coventry, written circa 1705 read, in part:

During the 18th century and early 19th century, as real tennis declined, new racquet sports emerged in England: rackets and squash racquets.

There is documented history of courts existing in the German states from the 17th century, the sport evidently died out there during or after World War II.

In Victorian England, real tennis had a revival, but broad public interest later shifted to the new, much less difficult outdoor game of lawn tennis, which soon became the more popular sport, and was played by both genders (real tennis players were almost exclusively male). Real tennis courts were built in Hobart, Tasmania (1875) and in the United States, starting in 1876 in Boston, and in New York in 1890, and later at athletic clubs in several other cities. Real tennis greatly influenced the game of stické, which was invented in the 19th century and combined aspects of real tennis, lawn tennis and rackets.

Real tennis has the longest line of consecutive world champions of any sport in the world, dating from 1760.

Victorian court master-builder
A forgotten master of designing, building and restoring real tennis courts was the British Fulham-based builder, Joseph Bickley (1835–1923). He became a specialist around 1889 and patented a plaster mix to withstand condensation and dampness. Examples of his surviving work include: The Queen's Club, Lord's, Hampton Court Palace, Jesmond Dene, Newmarket, Moreton Hall, Warwickshire and Petworth House. There are also examples of his projects in Scotland and in the United States.

Locations

There are more than 50 real tennis courts in the world, and over half of these are in Britain.

United Kingdom
 Bristol and Bath Tennis Club, Bristol: 1 court in use
 Cambridge University Real Tennis Club, Cambridge, Cambridgeshire: 2 courts in use
 Canford, Dorset: Sir Ivor Guest opened the court at Canford in 1879, although there had been an earlier court built in the grounds of the manor house dating back to 1541. It is still in use in a building that belongs to Canford School and also now houses four squash courts: 1 court in use
 The Fairlawne Estate, Plaxtol, Kent: 1 court (private)
 Falkland Palace, Fife, Scotland: The oldest court in the world for real tennis, opened in 1539, currently home of the Falkland Palace Royal Tennis Club : 1 quarré court in use
 Hardwick House, Whitchurch-on-Thames, Oxfordshire: 1 court in use
 Hatfield House Tennis Club, Hatfield, Hertfordshire: 1 court in use
 Hyde Tennis Club, Bridport, Dorset: 1 court in use
 Jesmond Dene, Newcastle: The court is situated on Matthew Bank near Jesmond Dene park, was built in 1894 for Sir Andrew Noble, the then-owner of Jesmond Dene House as a private court. It is now a listed building.: 1 court in use
 Leamington Spa Tennis Court Club, built in 1846, it is the oldest purpose built real tennis club in the world: 1 court in use
 The Manchester Club: Originated in 1874, the current club on Blackfriars Road was built in 1880: 1 court in use
 Marylebone Cricket Club, St John's Wood, London: 1 court in use
 Merton Street tennis court, Oxford, built 1798, on the site of courts dating back to c.1595. The smallest court in England and the second oldest: 1 court in use
  Middlesex University Real Tennis Club, Hendon, London: 1 court in use
 Moreton Morrell Tennis Court Club, Moreton Morrell, Warwickshire: 1 court in use
 Newmarket and Suffolk Real Tennis Club, Newmarket, Suffolk: 1 court in use
 The Oratory School, Woodcote. Opened in 1954, a club situated in one of the leading catholic private schools in England. Its many sports facilities include court tennis: 1 court in use
 Petworth House, West Sussex: The first court was built in 1588, and the current one was built in 1872: 1 court in use
 Prested Hall Racket Club, Feering, Essex: 2 courts in use
 The Queen's Club, London: Opened in 1886, is the National headquarters of the governing body of real tennis, the Tennis and Rackets Association (T&RA), and hosts the British Open every year: 2 courts in use
 Radley College. Opened in 2008, a court situated in one of the three remaining boys-only, boarding-only public schools (independent secondary schools) in the United Kingdom: 1 court in use
 Royal County of Berkshire Real Tennis Club, Holyport, Berkshire: 1 court in use
 Royal Tennis Court, Hampton Court Palace: The oldest surviving real tennis court in England, built on the site of an even older (1528) court in the 1620s, where the game can be watched by the general public during British Summer Time: 1 court in use
 Seacourt Tennis Club, Hayling Island, Hampshire: 1 court in use
 Wellington College, Crowthorne: Opened in 2016, the court is situated on the Wellington College estate: 1 court in use

United States of America
 The Racquet Club of Philadelphia: Founded in 1889, current location constructed in 1907 by noted architect Horace Trumbauer.
 The Tennis and Racquet Club, Boston, MA: One of the oldest courts in the US, opened in 1902.
 The Racquet and Tennis Club, NY: New York City's famously exclusive tennis club, contains two real tennis courts, as well as a Racquets court, built in 1918.
 Prince's Court, McLean, VA: The newest court in the United States, replacing the court opened in 1997, is now integrated within Westwood Country Club.
 National Tennis Club in Newport, RI: Located in the 'Newport Casino" now known as the International Tennis Hall of Fame.
 The Tuxedo Club in Tuxedo Park, NY: Private member-owned country club. Its many sports facilities include court tennis. The court building was constructed between 1890 and 1900.
 The Aiken Tennis Club: in Aiken, South Carolina, founded in 1898 by William C. Whitney political leader, financier and a key figure in the prominent Whitney family. The court building was constructed in 1902.
 The Racquet Club of Chicago: real tennis court was restored and re-opened in 2012 to complement the racquets and squash courts.
 Georgian Court University in Lakewood Township, New Jersey: built by George Jay Gould in 1899.
 Greentree: on the former Whitney estate on the north shore of Long Island (the town of Manhasset); now a dormant court and accessible only to staff of the United Nations under exceptional circumstances. 

New court projects
 Charleston, South Carolina: as part of the Daniel Island Club.

France
 Palace of Fontainebleau, France: the largest real tennis court in the world, and one of the few publicly owned.
 Paris, France: 74 rue Lauriston, Jeu de Paume. Known as 'Société Sportive du Jeu de Paume & de Racquets', this club was privately built in 1908 after the Jeu de Paume in the Tuileries gardens was transformed into an art gallery/ exhibition hall.
 Bordeaux, France: a new court was built in 2019/2020 and is located in Mérignac. This modern facility replaces the 1st Merignac court which closed in 2013 whose predecessor was the original Bordeaux court which closed in 1978.
Restoration projects: 

 Pau: A Trinquet court near the border with Spain, this club is actively seeking funds and support from local government to make the necessary transformations to the court to become an official real tennis court  

 Chinon, involving the total rehabilitation of an old court

Ireland
 Lambay Island, Ireland: On the privately owned Lambay Island (approx 5 km off the coast near Dublin, Ireland).
 Dublin (St Stephens Green); ongoing discussions with local government and building owners; the Irish RT Association remains cautiously optimistic

Australia
 Hobart Real Tennis Club, Tasmania: Founded in 1875 and the oldest real tennis club in Australia.
 Royal Melbourne Tennis Club, Victoria: Founded in 1882, it is one of only five clubs in the world with more than one court.
 Ballarat tennis club, Victoria
 Sydney Real Tennis Club, New South Wales (court closed in 2005). New court planned.
 Cope-Williams Real Tennis Club, Romsey, Victoria (closed).

In literature
Tennis is mentioned in literature from the 16th century onwards. It is frequently shown in emblem books, such as those of Guillaume de La Perrière from 1539. Erasmus lets two students practice Latin during a game of tennis with a racquet in 1522, although the playing ground is not mentioned. A 1581 translation of Ovid's Metamorphoses by Giovanni Andrea dell'Anguillara, printed in Venice in quarto form transforms the fatal discus game between Apollo and Hyacinth into a fatal game of real tennis, or "racchetta."

William Shakespeare mentions the game in Act I Scene II of Henry V; the Dauphin, a French Prince, sends King Henry a gift of tennis-balls, out of jest, in response to Henry's claim to the French throne. King Henry replies to the French Ambassadors:
"His present and your pains we thank you for: When we have matched our rackets to these balls, we will, in France, by God's grace, play a set [that] shall strike his father's crown into the hazard ... And tell the pleasant Prince this mock of his hath turn'd his balls to gun stones". Michael Drayton makes a similar reference to the event in his The bataille of Agincourt, published in 1627.

The Penguin book of Sick Verse includes a poem by William Lathum comparing life to a tennis-court:

If in my weak conceit, (for selfe disport),
The world I sample to a Tennis-court,
Where fate and fortune daily meet to play,
I doe conceive, I doe not much misse-say.
All manner chance are Rackets, wherewithall
They bandie men, from wall to wall;
Some over Lyne, to honour and great place,
Some under Lyne, to infame and disgrace;
Some with a cutting stroke they nimbly sent
Into the hazard placed at the end; ...

The Scottish gothic novel The Private Memoirs and Confessions of a Justified Sinner by James Hogg (1824) describes a tennis match that degenerates into violence.

The detective story Dead Nick takes place in a tennis milieu. The title alludes to a shot that hits "the nick" (where the wall meets the floor), called "dead" because it then bounces very little and is frequently unreturnable.

Hazard Chase (1964), by Jeremy Potter, is a thriller-detective story featuring real tennis on the court at Hampton Court Palace. During the story the game is explained, and the book contains a diagram of a real tennis court. Jeremy Potter wrote historical works (including Tennis and Oxford (1994)), and was himself an accomplished player of the game, winning the World Amateur Over-60s Championship in 1986.

The First Beautiful Game: Stories of Obsession in Real Tennis (2006) by top amateur player Roman Krznaric contains a mixture of real tennis history, memoir and fiction, which focuses on what can be learned from real tennis about the art of living.

The Corpse on the Court (2013) is a mystery by Simon Brett. It features the recurring lead character of Jude learning many details about the sport from aficionados.

In The Chase by Ivor P. Cooper, in Ring of Fire II in the 1632 series, up-timers Heather Mason and Judy Wendell learn the sport from Thomas Hobbes. Gustavus Adolphus of Sweden is depicted as an aficionado of the game.

Sudden Death (2013), a novel by Alvaro Enrigue, is interstitched throughout with descriptions of a real tennis match between the Italian artist Caravaggio and the Spanish poet Quevedo. The details of play are interspersed among historical reflections on the game, descriptions of techniques for making the balls, quotations from contemporary sources, gambling that accompanied the game, the backgrounds of the participants and the strategy discussions between the players and their seconds. It is intentionally unclear which details are real and which are imagined by the author.

In film

Real tennis is featured in the film The Seven-Per-Cent Solution, a fictional meeting between Sherlock Holmes and Sigmund Freud. One of the film's plot points turns on Freud playing a grudge match with a Prussian nobleman (in lieu of a duel).

The film The French Lieutenant's Woman includes a sequence featuring a few points being played. Also The Three Musketeers (1973) and Ever After briefly feature the game. Although presented with varying degrees of accuracy, these films provide a chance to see the game played, which otherwise may be difficult to observe personally.

The Showtime series The Tudors (2007) portrays Henry VIII playing the game. The film The Man Who Knew Infinity features a short sequence of G. H. Hardy (Jeremy Irons) and John Edensor Littlewood (Toby Jones) playing real tennis.

The series Billions, Opportunity Zone episode, very briefly features Damian Lewis and Harry Lennix playing real tennis.

In the movie Rosencrantz & Guildenstern Are Dead they play a game of questions in a disused real tennis court.

A pair of supporting characters is seen briefly playing real tennis about 62 minutes into the 1984 Rob Lowe movie Oxford Blues.

Televised / streamed matches
Real tennis has occasionally been televised, but the court (which does not well lend itself to the placement of cameras), the speed at which the ball travels, and the complexity of the rules all militate against the effectiveness and popularity of televised programming.

Web-streaming is proving a helpful innovation, and realtennis.tv broadcast its first tournament, the European Open, from 8–9 March 2011. 

Many top national and international tournaments can be seen live or on replay via YouTube channels.

Notable players
 Prince Edward, Earl of Wessex who notably played on 50 courts around the world in 2018 to support the Duke of Edinburgh’s Award.
 Joshua Crane: American champion from 1901 to 1905, Crane's career coincided with that of Jay Gould.
 Pierre Etchebaster: World Champion, 1928–1953, d. 24 March 1980.
 Claire Vigrass Fahey: Current Women's World Champion
 Robert Fahey: World Champion, 1994–2016, 2018. Fahey successfully defended his world championship title more times (11) than any previous champion. In April 2018 he regained the title defeating Camden Riviere 7 sets to 5.
 Jay Gould II: American champion from 1906 to 1926, one of the longest streaks in the history of sport. From 1907 to 1925, he lost only one singles match, to English champion E. M. Baerlein. During that period, he never lost even a set to an amateur.
 G. H. Hardy
 John Moyer Heathcote
 King Henry VIII of England
 Jeremy Howard, President and Chief Scientist of Kaggle, Co-Founder of Optimal Decision Group and Fastmail.fm
 King John III of Sweden
 Northrup R. Knox, multiple-time American champion. He retired undefeated.
 George Lambert
 King Louis X of France
 Penny Fellows Lumley, multiple singles and doubles champion in British, US, French and Australian Opens. Grand Slam 1996–97. Now Ladies Masters Champion.
 Hon. Alfred Lyttelton
 Julian Marshall
 Eustace Miles: The first foreign winner of the American championship in 1900. Unusually for the period, Miles was a vegetarian, and produced a book on dietetics entitled Muscle, Brain and Diet.
 Tom Pettitt
 Camden Riviere: 2016, 2022 World Champion
 Chris Ronaldson: World Champion, 1981–1987
 John Rowan World Interbank Challenge Champion
 Richard D. Sears: First American amateur champion of court tennis in 1892, and apparent inventor of the overhead "railroad service," currently the most popular serve in the game.
 Fred Tompkins: Head professional of the Philadelphia court. When the New York Racquet and Tennis club opened, Fred Tompkins was invited to be head professional. However, when Fred went to his brother Alfred to borrow money for his passage, Alfred decided to go over in Fred's place; Fred Tompkins later took over the Philadelphia court instead.
 Sarah Vigrass: Two-time World Doubles Champion (with her sister; Claire)
 Pierre Cipriano: US National Team member, 3x consecutive Tuxedo Gold Racquet winner and inventor of the ‘Viper’ serve, an automatic way of winning a point when the server stands at Second Gallery and hits the ball as hard as he can directly at (and hopefully striking) his opponent who is set to receive.

See also
 List of real tennis world champions
 Grand Slam (real tennis)
 History of tennis

References

External links

 Article "Tennis" in the 1797 edition of Encyclopedia Britannica
 The Real Tennis Society
 Real tennis in Jesmond, article at BBC Tyne
 Photos of real tennis court in Jesmond, from BBC Tyne
 A History of Tennis
 An interactive map of all 50+ courts worldwide
 "It Takes a $100,000 Court like This to Play Court Tennis," Life, March 1, 1937, pp. 28–31. (Text and pictures of the court at Manhattan's Racquet and Tennis Club)
 Historic Real Tennis Court in the Casino Building on the campus of Georgian Court University, Lakewood, NJ
 Official site of the French Courte Paume Comité (Real tennis in french) 

 
Forms of tennis
Sport in Hammersmith and Fulham
Ball games
Racket sports